Erle Edwards Barham (July 10, 1937 – October 17, 2014) was a Republican member of the Louisiana State Senate. He first won the Senate seat in December 1975 beating L. B. Loftin by just 89 votes.

Barham was a certified flight instructor, and was killed when he struck a perimeter fence while taxiing an airplane on the runway.

References

1937 births
2014 deaths
People from Morehouse Parish, Louisiana
Republican Party Louisiana state senators
Farmers from Louisiana
American conservationists
Louisiana State University alumni
Politicians from Monroe, Louisiana
University of Louisiana at Monroe alumni
Businesspeople from Louisiana
Accidental deaths in Louisiana
Victims of aviation accidents or incidents in the United States
People from Sidon, Mississippi
People from Greenwood, Mississippi
20th-century American businesspeople
20th-century American Episcopalians